Hans-Christoph Daase (born July 9, 1983; also known as Christoph Daase) is a German curler.

Teams

References

External links

Living people
1983 births

German male curlers
21st-century German people